Schwarza is a municipality in the Schmalkalden-Meiningen district, Thuringia, Germany.  It lies between Zella-Mehlis and Meiningen.

References

Schmalkalden-Meiningen